Rudgy Pajany (born Jérôme Pajany, on July 6, 1990 in Dakar) is a French singer specialised in covers of 1960's, 1970's and 1980's songs. He is more particularly known for his titles Mistral Gagnant (out in 2013) and En Silence (out in 2015)

Biography 

Rudgy Pajany has gained some international notoriety owing to diffusion through medias of the whole world (Italy, United States, France) of his Mistral Gagnant and En Silence covers.

In 2016 the album Pluie D'été was out, the first single of which was En Silence. This album also includes a song written by Hervé Vilard for Rudgy Pajany, J'ne serai jamais

Discography

Albums 
 Mes Jours (2014)
 Pluie d'été (2015) 
 Pluie D'été édition spéciale (2018)

Next album (2018)

During his last interview at the radio station Chérie80’s, the artist announced his next album would be out in 2018.

Singles 
MIstral Gagnant (2013)
 La Bohème (2014)
 En Silence (2015)
 Objectif Terre (2015)
 Mon Amant de St Jean (2016)
 Maman (2017)

References

External links 
  Official website
  Interview with Rudgy Pajany on chérie 80's

1990 births
Living people
21st-century French singers
French people of Indian descent
21st-century French male singers
Senegalese emigrants to France
Naturalized citizens of France